Timothy Melia (born May 15, 1986) is an American professional soccer player who plays as a goalkeeper for Major League Soccer club Sporting Kansas City.

Youth and college
Melia was born in Great River, New York. Melia attended East Islip High School and played two years of college soccer at the State University of New York at Oneonta before transferring to Lynn University in 2006, where he played his junior and senior years.

Melia played for the Long Island Rough Riders in the USL Premier Development League in 2007.

Professional career

Rochester Rhinos
Melia signed with the Rochester Rhinos of the USL First Division on April 30, 2008. An injury to veteran goalkeeper Scott Vallow resulted in increased playing time and a number of starts for Melia during the 2009 season, and he became known for his accurate long balls from goal kicks and dead-ball situations.

Real Salt Lake
After trialling with Real Salt Lake during their pre-season, Melia signed with the club on March 16, 2010; he was sent on loan to USL Division 2 side Charleston Battery in April. Following his clean sheet on June 29 in a U.S. Open Cup match against the Chicago Fire (Charleston won 3-0 on penalty kicks), Melia was named "Player of the 3rd Round" for the 2010 Lamar Hunt U.S. Open Cup. Melia was waived by Real Salt Lake on November 23, 2011.

Chivas USA
Melia signed with Chivas USA in January 2012 and joined them during the 2012 pre-season. During his time with Chivas, Melia made six league appearances for the club.

MLS Pool Goalkeeper
In the middle of the 2014 season, Melia was released by Chivas and became the league pool goalkeeper for Major League Soccer since he had a guaranteed contract. In August 2014, Sporting Kansas City called Melia up from the league pool after two of the team's three goalies, Eric Kronberg and Andy Gruenebaum, were injured. He was later called up by FC Dallas and D.C. United on an emergency basis, but he did not make any appearances.

Sporting KC 
In December 2014, after having joined them in the previous season as an emergency pool goalkeeper, he signed with Sporting KC for the 2015 season.

After beginning the 2015 season as the understudy to starter Luis Marín, Melia emerged as the starter in May and was the primary goalkeeper for the remainder of the season. For his breakthrough efforts, Melia was named MLS Comeback Player of the Year.

Since earning the starting job, Melia has emerged as one of the top keepers in the league. He has led SKC to the U.S. Open Cup titles in both 2015, where SKC prevailed in a penalty shootout, and 2017, a hard-fought victory against the New York Red Bulls. Following a 2017 season where he allowed a record-low 0.78 goals per game, Melia was named MLS Goalkeeper of the Year, and also earned a spot on the MLS Best XI.

Honors
Charleston Battery
USL Second Division Champions: 2010
USL Second Division Regular Season Champions: 2010

Sporting Kansas City
U.S. Open Cup: 2015, 2017

Individual
MLS Comeback Player of the Year: 2015
Man of the Match: 2015 US Open Cup Finals
Player of the tournament: 2017 US Open Cup
MLS Goalkeeper of the Year: 2017
Sporting Kansas City Most Valuable Player: 2017
MLS Best XI: 2017

References

External links

1986 births
Living people
American soccer players
Association football goalkeepers
Charleston Battery players
Chivas USA players
F.C. New York players
Long Island Rough Riders players
Lynn Fighting Knights men's soccer players
Major League Soccer players
Oneonta State Red Dragons men's soccer players
People from East Islip, New York
Soccer players from New York (state)
Real Salt Lake players
Rochester New York FC players
Sporting Kansas City players
USL Championship players
USL First Division players
USL League Two players
USL Second Division players